William Tedmarsh (3 February 1876 - 10 May 1937) was an English-American early silent film actor. 
 
Born in London, Tedmarsh moved to New York City as a child and began stage acting. He was signed into film in 1912 and starred in 34 films until 1916.

Tedmarsh starred in films such as A Blowout at Santa Banana in 1914 working with acclaimed actors such as Sydney Ayres and Charlotte Burton.

He died on May 10, 1937.

Selected filmography
 The Twinkler (1916)
 Sequel to the Diamond from the Sky (1915)
 The Secret of the Submarine (1915)
 The Diamond from the Sky (1915)
 The Wily Chaperon (1915)
 The Cocoon and the Butterfly (1914)
 A Blowout at Santa Banana (1914)
 The Shriner's Daughter (1913)

External links
 

Male actors from London
English male silent film actors
British emigrants to the United States
1876 births
1937 deaths
20th-century English male actors
20th-century American male actors